Andrzej Piotrowski may refer to:

 Andrzej Piotrowski (skier) (born 1969), Polish cross-country skier
 Andrzej Piotrowski (weightlifter) (born 1958), Polish weightlifter